Aminabad (also Romanized as Amīnābād) is a village in Qurigol Rural District, in the Central District of Bostanabad County, East Azerbaijan Province, Iran. At the 2006 census, its population was 37, in 6 families.

References 

Populated places in Bostanabad County